Estêvão da Gama ( 1505–1576) was the Portuguese governor of Portuguese Gold Coast (1529–15??) and Portuguese India (1540–1542). Named after his paternal grandfather Estêvão da Gama, Estêvão was the second son of Vasco da Gama, and the brother of Cristóvão da Gama.

He commanded the fleet that entered the Red Sea, with the intent of attacking the Ottoman fleet in its harbor at Suez, leaving Goa on 31 December 1540 and reaching Aden on 27 January 1541. The fleet reached Massawa on 12 February, where Gama left a number of ships and continued north. Reaching Suez, he discovered that the Ottomans had long had intelligence of his raid, and foiled his attempt to burn their beached ships. Gama was forced to retrace his steps to Massawa, although pausing to attack the port of El-Tor on the Sinai Peninsula.

Once back at Massawa, Gama found the men he had left were restless and convinced by the self-described patriarch João Bermudes that they should provide military assistance to the beleaguered emperor of Ethiopia. Gama acquiesced to their demands, and landed 400 men, 130 military slaves, and sufficient supplies for them at Massawa and the nearby port of Arqiqo under the charge of his brother Cristóvão, before departing for India on 9 July.

Cultural depiction 
 Estêvão da Gama appears in the 2011 Indian film Urumi, portrayed by the American actor Alexx O'Nell.

External links 
 Don Juan de Castro The Voyage of Don Stefano de Gama from Goa to Suez, in 1540, with the intention of Burning the Turkish Galleys at that port (Volume 6, Chapter 3, eText)

1500s births
1576 deaths
Portuguese soldiers
Viceroys of Portuguese India
Year of birth uncertain
Portuguese colonial governors and administrators
16th-century Portuguese people
Captain-majors of Portuguese Gold Coast
Estevao